North River Mountain is a mountain ridge that runs southwest to northeast in Hampshire County, West Virginia, United States. Named for the North River that parallels its western flanks for its entire length, North River Mountain reaches its highest elevation of  near the community of Delray. North River Mountain extends from Staack's Gap at Rio to the Hiett Run gap at North River Mills. Geologically, Ice Mountain is the same mountain ridge, with the Hiett Run gap acting as the physical divide.

References 

Ridges of Hampshire County, West Virginia
Ridges of West Virginia
Northwestern Turnpike